Balcastle is a historic home located at Southampton in Suffolk County, New York. It was built in 1910 and is a large 1-story, five-bay, brick-sheathed residence with a small -story octagonal tower on the west side and large, 2-story square tower on the east side. It is an example of castellated Gothic architecture. Also on the property is a small, wood-frame hexagonal garden pavilion.

It was added to the National Register of Historic Places in 1986.

References

Houses on the National Register of Historic Places in New York (state)
Houses completed in 1910
Houses in Suffolk County, New York
Southampton (village), New York
National Register of Historic Places in Suffolk County, New York